The Stephen Beech Cleveland House, also known as The Lodge, is a historic house in Suggsville, Clarke County, Alabama.  The one-story wood-frame house was completed in 1860 by Stephen Beech Cleveland. Upon completion of the home, Beech lived in it with his wife, two young children and his younger brother, according to census data. The house has a mid 19th century revival architectural style, with a limestone foundation and asphalt roof, as noted in the National Register of Historic Places.  It features a wrap-around porch on the front and one side.  It was listed on the National Register of Historic Places on July 28, 1999, due to its architectural significance.

References

Houses on the National Register of Historic Places in Alabama
Houses completed in 1865
National Register of Historic Places in Clarke County, Alabama
Houses in Clarke County, Alabama